The Del Wilson Trophy is presented annually to the Western Hockey League's goaltender judged to be the best at his position. The award is named after Del Wilson for his many years of service to both the Regina Pats and the League. Wilson was an owner, Governor, and General Manager of the Pats and served 6 years as Chairman of the Board of the WHL. Wilson led the WHL into a partnership with Ontario and Quebec Major Junior Leagues.

Previously, the WHL Top Goaltender Award. It was given to the League's Goals Against Average leader.

Winners 

Blue background denotes also named CHL Goaltender of the Year
1The WHL handed out separate awards for the East and West divisions.

See also
CHL Goaltender of the Year
OHL Goaltender of the Year
Jacques Plante Memorial Trophy - Quebec Major Junior Hockey League Goaltender of the Year

References

Western Hockey League trophies and awards